The cinema of South Korea refers to the film industry of South Korea from 1945 to present. South Korean films have been heavily influenced by such events and forces as the Japanese occupation of Korea, the Korean War, government censorship, the business sector, globalization, and the democratization of South Korea.

The golden age of South Korean cinema in the mid-20th century produced what are considered two of the best South Korean films of all time, The Housemaid (1960) and Obaltan (1961), while the industry's revival with the Korean New Wave from the late 1990s to the present produced both of the country's highest-grossing films, The Admiral: Roaring Currents (2014) and Extreme Job (2019), as well as prize winners on the festival circuit including Golden Lion recipient Pietà (2012) and Palme d'Or recipient and Academy Award winner Parasite (2019) and international cult classics including Oldboy (2003), Snowpiercer (2013), and Train to Busan (2016).

With the increasing global success and globalization of the Korean film industry, the past two decades have seen Korean actors like Lee Byung-hun and Bae Doona star in American films, Korean auteurs such as Park Chan-wook and Bong Joon-ho direct English-language works, Korean American actors crossover to star in Korean films as with Steven Yeun and Ma Dong-seok, and Korean films be remade in the United States, China, and other markets. The Busan International Film Festival has also grown to become Asia's largest and most important film festival.

American film studios have also set up local subsidiaries like Warner Bros. Korea and 20th Century Fox Korea to finance Korean films like The Age of Shadows (2016) and The Wailing (2016), putting them in direct competition with Korea's Big Four vertically-integrated domestic film production and distribution companies: Lotte Cultureworks (formerly Lotte Entertainment), CJ Entertainment, Next Entertainment World (NEW), and Showbox. Netflix has also entered Korea as a film producer and distributor as part of both its international growth strategy in search of new markets and its drive to find new content for consumers in the U.S. market amid the "streaming wars" with Disney, which has a Korean subsidiary, and other competitors.

History

Liberation and war (1945-1953) 

With the surrender of Japan in 1945 and the subsequent liberation of Korea, freedom became the predominant theme in South Korean cinema in the late 1940s and early 1950s. One of the most significant films from this era is director Choi In-gyu's Viva Freedom! (1946), which is notable for depicting the Korean independence movement. The film was a major commercial success because it tapped into the public's excitement about the country's recent liberation.

However, during the Korean War, the South Korean film industry stagnated, and only 14 films were produced from 1950 to 1953. All of the films from that era have since been lost. Following the Korean War armistice in 1953, South Korean president Syngman Rhee attempted to rejuvenate the film industry by exempting it from taxation. Additionally foreign aid arrived in the country after the war that provided South Korean filmmakers with equipment and technology to begin producing more films.

Golden age (1955-1972) 

Though filmmakers were still subject to government censorship, South Korea experienced a golden age of cinema, mostly consisting of melodramas, starting in the mid-1950s. The number of films made in South Korea increased from only 15 in 1954 to 111 in 1959.

One of the most popular films of the era, director Lee Kyu-hwan's now lost remake of Chunhyang-jeon (1955), drew 10 percent of Seoul's population to movie theaters However, while Chunhyang-jeon re-told a traditional Korean story, another popular film of the era, Han Hyung-mo's Madame Freedom (1956), told a modern story about female sexuality and Western values.

South Korean filmmakers enjoyed a brief freedom from censorship in the early 1960s, between the administrations of Syngman Rhee and Park Chung-hee. Kim Ki-young's The Housemaid (1960) and Yu Hyun-mok's Obaltan (1960), now considered among the best South Korean films ever made, were produced during this time. Kang Dae-jin's The Coachman (1961) became the first South Korean film to win an award at an international film festival when it took home the Silver Bear Jury Prize at the 1961 Berlin International Film Festival.

When Park Chung-hee became acting president in 1962, government control over the film industry increased substantially. Under the Motion Picture Law of 1962, a series of increasingly restrictive measures was enacted that limited imported films under a quota system. The new regulations also reduced the number of domestic film-production companies from 71 to 16 within a year. Government censorship targeted obscenity, communism, and unpatriotic themes in films.
Nonetheless, the Motion Picture Law's limit on imported films resulted in a boom of domestic films. South Korean filmmakers had to work quickly to meet public demand, and many films were shot in only a few weeks. During the 1960s, the most popular South Korean filmmakers released six to eight films per year. Notably, director Kim Soo-yong released ten films in 1967, including Mist, which is considered to be his greatest work.

In 1967, South Korea's first animated feature film, Hong Kil-dong, was released. A handful of animated films followed including Golden Iron Man (1968), South Korea's first science-fiction animated film.

Censorship and propaganda (1973–1979) 
Government control of South Korea's film industry reached its height during the 1970s under President Park Chung-hee's authoritarian "Yusin System." The Korean Motion Picture Promotion Corporation was created in 1973, ostensibly to support and promote the South Korean film industry, but its primary purpose was to control the film industry and promote "politically correct" support for censorship and government ideals. According to the 1981 International Film Guide, "No country has a stricter code of film censorship than South Korea – with the possible exception of the North Koreans and some other Communist bloc countries."

Only filmmakers who had previously produced "ideologically sound" films and who were considered to be loyal to the government were allowed to release new films. Members of the film industry who tried to bypass censorship laws were blacklisted and sometimes imprisoned. One such blacklisted filmmaker, the prolific director Shin Sang-ok, was kidnapped by the North Korean government in 1978 after the South Korean government revoked his film-making license in 1975.

The propaganda-laden movies (or "policy films") produced in the 1970s were unpopular with audiences who had become accustomed to seeing real-life social issues onscreen during the 1950s and 1960s. In addition to government interference, South Korean filmmakers began losing their audience to television, and movie-theater attendance dropped by over 60 percent from 1969 to 1979.

Films that were popular among audiences during this era include Yeong-ja's Heydays (1975) and Winter Woman (1977), both box office hits directed by Kim Ho-sun. Yeong-ja's Heydays and Winter Women are classified as "hostess films," which are movies about prostitutes and bargirls. Despite their overt sexual content, the government allowed the films to be released, and the genre was extremely popular during the 1970s and 1980s.

Recovery (1980–1996) 
In the 1980s, the South Korean government began to relax its censorship and control of the film industry. The Motion Picture Law of 1984 allowed independent filmmakers to begin producing films, and the 1986 revision of the law allowed more films to be imported into South Korea.

Meanwhile, South Korean films began reaching international audiences for the first time in a significant way. Director Im Kwon-taek's Mandala (1981) won the Grand Prix at the 1981 Hawaii Film Festival, and he soon became the first Korean director in years to have his films screened at European film festivals. His film Gilsoddeum (1986) was shown at the 36th Berlin International Film Festival, and actress Kang Soo-yeon won Best Actress at the 1987 Venice International Film Festival for her role in Im's film, The Surrogate Woman.

In 1988, the South Korean government lifted all restrictions on foreign films, and American film companies began to set up offices in South Korea. In order for domestic films to compete, the government once again enforced a screen quota that required movie theaters to show domestic films for at least 146 days per year. However, despite the quota, the market share of domestic films was only 16 percent by 1993.

The South Korean film industry was once again changed in 1992 with Kim Ui-seok's hit film Marriage Story, released by Samsung. It was the first South Korean movie to be released by business conglomerate known as a chaebol, and it paved the way for other chaebols to enter the film industry, using an integrated system of financing, producing, and distributing films.

Renaissance (1997–present) 
As a result of the 1997 Asian financial crisis, many chaebols began to scale back their involvement in the film industry. However, they had already laid the groundwork for a renaissance in South Korean film-making by supporting young directors and introducing good business practices into the industry. "New Korean Cinema," including glossy blockbusters and creative genre films, began to emerge in the late 1990s and 2000s.

South Korean cinema saw domestic box-office success exceeding that of Hollywood films in the late 1990s largely due to screen quota laws that limited the public showing foreign films. First enacted in 1967, South Korea's screen quota placed restrictions on the number of days per year that foreign films could be shown at any given theater—garnering criticism from film distributors outside South Korea as unfair. As a prerequisite for negotiations with the United States for a free-trade agreement, the Korean government cut its annual screen quota for domestic films from 146 days to 73 (allowing more foreign films to enter the market). In February 2006, South Korean movie workers responded to the reduction by staging mass rallies in protest. According to Kim Hyun, "South Korea's movie industry, like that of most countries, is grossly overshadowed by Hollywood. The nation exported US$2 million-worth of movies to the United States last year and imported $35.9 million-worth".

One of the first blockbusters was Kang Je-gyu's Shiri (1999), a film about a North Korean spy in Seoul. It was the first film in South Korean history to sell more than two million tickets in Seoul alone. Shiri was followed by other blockbusters including Park Chan-wook's Joint Security Area (2000), Kwak Jae-yong's My Sassy Girl (2001), Kwak Kyung-taek's Friend (2001), Kang Woo-suk's Silmido (2003), and Kang Je-gyu's Taegukgi (2004). In fact, both Silmido and Taegukgi were seen by 10 million people domestically—about one-quarter of South Korea's entire population.

South Korean films began attracting significant international attention in the 2000s, due in part to filmmaker Park Chan-wook, whose movie Oldboy (2003) won the Grand Prix at the 2004 Cannes Film Festival and was praised by American directors including Quentin Tarantino and Spike Lee, the latter of whom directed the remake Oldboy (2013).

Director Bong Joon-ho's The Host (2006) and later the English-language film Snowpiercer (2013), are among the highest-grossing films of all time in South Korea and were praised by foreign film critics. Yeon Sang-ho's Train to Busan (2016), also one of the highest-grossing films of all time in South Korea, became the second highest-grossing film in Hong Kong in 2016.

In 2019, Bong Joon-ho's Parasite became the first film from South Korea to win the prestigious Palme d'Or at the Cannes Film Festival. At the 92nd Academy Awards, Parasite became the first South Korean film to receive any sort of Academy Awards recognition, receiving six nominations. It won Best Picture, Best Director, Best International Feature Film and Best Original Screenplay, becoming the first film produced entirely by an Asian country to receive a nomination for the Academy Award for Best Picture since Crouching Tiger, Hidden Dragon, as well as the first film not in English ever to win the Oscar for Best Picture.

LGBTQ cinema 
LGBTQ films and representations of LGBTQ characters in South Korean cinema can be seen since the beginning of South Korean cinema despite public perceptions of South Korea as being largely anti-LGBT. Defining "queer cinema" has been up for debate by critics of cinema because of the difficulties in defining "queer" in film contexts. The term "queer" has its roots in the English language and although its origins held negative connotations, reclamation of the term began in the 1980s in the U.S. and has come to encompass non-heteronormative sexualities even outside of the U.S. Thus, queer cinema in South Korea can be thought of as encompassing depictions of non-heteronormative sexualities. On this note, LGBTQ and queer have been used interchangeably by critics of South Korean cinema. While the characteristics that constitute a film as LGBTQ can be subjective due to defining the term "queer" as well as how explicit or implicit LGBTQ representation is in a film, there are a number of films that have been considered as such in Korean cinema.

According to Pil Ho Kim, Korean queer cinema can be categorized into three different categories regarding visibility and public reception. There is the Invisible Age (1945-1997), where films with queer themes have received limited attention as well as discrete representations due to societal pressures, the Camouflage Age (1998-2004) characterized by a more liberal political and social sphere that encouraged filmmakers to increase production of LGBTQ films and experiment more with their overt depictions but still remaining hesitant, and finally, the Blockbuster Age (2005–present) where LGBTQ themed films began to enter the mainstream following the push against censorship by independent films prior.

Though queer Korean cinema has mainly been represented through independent films and short films, there exists a push for the inclusion of LGBTQ representation in the cinema as well as a call for attention to these films. Turning points include the dismantling of the much stricter Korean Performing Arts Ethics Committee and the emergence of the Korean Council for Performing Arts Promotions and the "Seoul Queer Film and Video Festival" in 1998 after the original gay and lesbian film festival was shut down by Korean authorities. The Korea Queer Film Festival, part of the Korea Queer Culture Festival, has also pushed for visibility of queer Korean films.

LGBTQ films by openly LGBTQ directors 
LGBTQ films by openly LGBTQ identifying directors have historically been released independently, with a majority of them being short films. The films listed reflect such films and reveal how diverse the representations can be.

 Everyday is Like Sunday (Lee Song Hee-il 1997): The independent, short film directed by openly-LGBTQ identifying Lee Hee-il follows two male characters who meet then become separated, with direct representation of their relationship as homosexual. The independent aspect of the film may have had a role in allowing for a more obvious representation of homosexuality since there is less pressure for appealing to a mainstream audience and does not require government sponsorship.
 No Regret (Lee Song Hee-il, 2006): An independent film co-directed by Lee Hee-il and Kim-Cho Kwang-su, both of whom had ties to the gay activist group Ch’in’gusai, portrays LGBTQ characters in a way that normalizes their identities. The film was also able to see more success than usual for independent films for its marketing strategy that targeted a primarily female audience with an interest in what is known as Boys' Love.
 Boy Meets Boy (Kimjo Kwang-soo, 2008): Claimed by the director to be inspired by their own personal experience, the independent short film tells an optimistic story of two men, with the possibility of mutual feelings of attraction after a brief encounter. Even though there is homosexual attraction, it is told through a heterosexual lens, since the masculinity of one character and the femininity of the other are in contrast with each other, creating ambiguity about their queerness due in part to homophobia in society and the political climate.
 Just Friends? (Kimjo Kwang-soo, 2009): This independent short film by Kimjo Kwang-soo, also written as Kim Cho Kwang-soo, represents LGBTQ characters, with the main character, Min-soo, having to deal with his mother’s disapproval of his relationship with another male character. This short film, like Boy Meets Boy also offers a more optimistic ending.
 Stateless Things (Kim Kyung-mook, 2011): In the film, both LGBT characters and Korean-Chinese immigrant workers are considered non-normative and are marginalized. The film can be considered to have a queer point-of-view in the sense that it has an experimental quality that creates ambiguity when it comes to non-normative themes. However, the film does depict graphic, homoeroticism, making the representation of homosexuality clear.

LGBTQ films not by openly LGBTQ directors 

 The Pollen of Flowers (Ha Kil-jong, 1972): Regarded as the first gay Korean film by the director’s brother Ha Myong-jung, the film depicts homosexuality in the film through tension in LGBTQ relationships though it was not typically regarded as a queer film at the time of release. The film's political message and critique of the president at the time, Park Chung-hee, may be the reason that queer relationships were overshadowed. In spite of being an earlier Korean film depicting homosexuality, the film is more explicit in these relationships than might be expected at the time.
 Ascetic: Woman and Woman (Kim Su-hyeong, 1976): Though the film was given award-winning status by the Korean press, during the time of the release, Ascetic remained an under-recognized film by the public. The film is seen as the first lesbian film by Korean magazine Buddy and tells the story of two women who develop feelings for each other. Though the homosexual feelings between the women are implied through “thinly-veiled sex acts” that could be more explicit, it was considered homosexual given the context of the heavy censorship regulations of the 1970s. Despite the film's status as a lesbian film, it has been noted that the director did not intend to make an LGBTQ film, but rather a feminist film by emphasizing the meaningfulness of the two women’s interactions and relationships. Even so, Kim Su-hyeong has said the film can be seen as both lesbian and feminist.
 Road Movie (Kim In-shik, 2002): Even though the film was released through a large distribution company, the film did not reach the expected mainstream box office success, yet it is still seen as a precursor to queer blockbuster films to come. The film is explicit in its homosexual content and portrays a complicated love triangle between two men and a woman while focusing primarily on a character who is homosexual. It is noteworthy that Road Movie is one of the few full-length feature films in South Korea to revolve around a queer main character.
 The King and the Clown (Lee Joon-ik, 2005): The King and the Clown is seen as having a major impact in queer cinema for its great mainstream success. In the film, one of the characters is seen as representing queer-ness through his embodiment of femininity, which is often regarded as the character trope of the “flower boy” or kkonminam. However, actual depictions of homosexuality are limited and are depicted only through a kiss. The King and the Clown is seen as influential because of its representation of suggested gay characters that preceded other queer films to come after it. The film depicts undertones of a love triangle between two jesters and a king and suggests homosexuality in a pre-modern time period (Joseon Dynasty) and is based on the play Yi (2000) which drew on the passage The Annals of the Choseon Dynasty, two pieces that were more explicit in their homosexuality in comparison the film. The representation of gay intimacy and attraction remains ambiguous in the film and has been criticized by the LGBT community for its portrayal of queerness.
 Frozen Flower (Yoo Ha, 2008): A Frozen Flower followed other queer films such as The King and the Clown, Broken Branches, and Road Movie. This film reached a mainstream audience which may have been due in part to a well-received actor playing a homosexual character. Critiques of the film have questioned the character Hong Lim’s homosexuality, however, it may be suggested that his character is actually bisexual. Despite the explicit homosexual/queer love scenes in the film that brought a shock to mainstream audiences, the film still managed to be successful and expose a large audience to a story about queer relationships.
 The Handmaiden (Park Chan-wook, 2016): The film is a cross-cultural adaptation of the lesbian novel Fingersmith written by Sarah Waters. The Handmaiden includes representation of lesbian characters who are seen expressing romantic feelings towards each other in a sensual way that has been critiqued as voyeuristic for its fetishization of the female body. Explicitly depicting the homosexual attraction of the characters Sook-hee and Lady Hideko is a bath scene where the act of filing down the other’s tooth has underlying sexual tension. The film had mainstream box-office success and "over the first six weeks of play [reached a gross] of £1.25 million".

Highest-grossing films 

The Korean Film Council has published box office data on South Korean films since 2004. As of March 2021, the top ten highest-grossing domestic films in South Korea since 2004 are as follows.
 The Admiral: Roaring Currents (2014)
 Extreme Job (2019)
 Along with the Gods: The Two Worlds (2017)
 Ode to My Father (2014)
 Veteran (2015)
 The Thieves (2012)
 Miracle in Cell No.7 (2013)
 Assassination (2015)
 Masquerade (2012)
 Along with the Gods: The Last 49 Days (2018)

Film awards 

South Korea's first film awards ceremonies were established in the 1950s, but have since been discontinued. The longest-running and most popular film awards ceremonies are the Grand Bell Awards, which were established in 1962, and the Blue Dragon Film Awards, which were established in 1963. Other awards ceremonies include the Baeksang Arts Awards, the Korean Association of Film Critics Awards, and the Busan Film Critics Awards.

Film festivals

In South Korea 

Founded in 1996, the Busan International Film Festival is South Korea's major film festival and has grown to become one of the largest and most prestigious film events in Asia.

South Korea at international festivals 
The first South Korean film to win an award at an international film festival was Kang Dae-jin's The Coachman (1961), which was awarded the Silver Bear Jury Prize at the 1961 Berlin International Film Festival. The tables below list South Korean films that have since won major international film festival prizes.

Academy Awards

Berlin International Film Festival

Cannes Film Festival

Venice Film Festival

Toronto International Film Festival

Sundance Film Festival

Telluride Film Festival

Tokyo International Film Festival

Locarno Festival

See also 
 Cinema of Korea
 Cinema of North Korea
 Korean horror
South Korean Queer Cinema

References 

 
 
 New Korean Cinema (2005), ed. by Chi-Yun Shin and Julian Stringer. Edinburgh: Edinburgh University Press.

External links 

 Korean Film Council
 Korean Film Archive
 Korean Movie Database (in Korean)